Bryn Kenney (born November 1, 1986) is an American professional poker player from Long Beach, New York.

Poker career
Kenney played Magic: The Gathering competitively before transitioning to poker. His first live cash was in 2007 at the East Coast Poker Championships.

Kenney won his first WSOP bracelet in 2014 after winning the $1,500 10-Game Mix Six Handed event, which earned him $153,220.

In 2016, Kenney defeated 2015 World Series of Poker Main Event champion, Joe McKeehen heads-up at the Pokerstars Caribbean Adventure $100K Super High Roller event winning $1,687,800.

After placing 2nd to Aaron Zang in the £1,050,000 No-Limit Hold'em - Triton Million for Charity Event, Kenney received the largest single payout in live poker tournament history of £16,890,509 ($20,563,324). The tournament had the largest scheduled single payout in poker tournament history with first place receiving £19,000,000 ($23,100,000). However, due to a prize splitting deal agreed with Zang, Kenney ended up receiving £16,890,509 ($20,563,324) for 2nd while Zang received the smaller prize of £13,779,491 ($16,775,820) for winning the tournament. The deal was made when the tournament entered heads up with Kenney holding an over 5:1 chip lead against Zang. Zang made a comeback and eventually won the tournament.

Kenney is ranked 4th on the Global Poker Index and 1st on the Hendon Mob All-Time Money List as of August 3, 2019. As of August 2020, his live tournament winnings exceed $55,000,000.

World Series of Poker

References

External links
 Bryn Kenney Hendon Mob profile
 Bryn Kenney Global Poker Index profile

1986 births
American poker players
World Series of Poker bracelet winners
People from Long Beach, New York
Living people